The Unchastened Woman is a lost 1918 silent film drama directed by William J. Humphrey and starring Grace Valentine. The film was based on the 1915 play The Unchastened Woman which starred Emily Stevens on Broadway. Theda Bara appeared in a 1925 version which was her comeback film after 4 years.

Cast
Grace Valentine - Caroline Knolleys
Mildred Manning - Emily Madden
Catherine Tower - Hildegard Sanbury
Edna Hunter - Susan Ambie
Frank R. Mills - Hubert Knolleys
Adelaide Barker - Mrs. Murtha
Victor Sutherland - Lawrence Sanbury
Paul Panzer - Michael Krellin
Mike Donlin - O'Brien
John Hopkins - The Man

References

External links

 The Unchastened Woman at IMDb.com

1918 films
American silent feature films
Lost American films
American films based on plays
American black-and-white films
Silent American drama films
1918 drama films
World Film Company films
1918 lost films
Lost drama films
Films directed by William J. Humphrey
1910s American films
1910s English-language films
English-language drama films